The VKS-737 Radio Network is a division of the Australian National 4WD Radio Network Inc., a national Public Benevolent Institution established for the relief of sickness, suffering, helplessness, destitution, and misfortune to a disadvantaged section of the community, being all 'outback' travellers who are in distress by providing them with emergency assistance and support in co-operation with other organisations.

The VKS-737 Network provides services in conjunction with the Royal Flying Doctor Service and State Emergency Service organisations 24 hours a day, 7 days a week via 17 Base Stations strategically located around Australia.

Subscribers can make unlimited free calls to emergency services and can also receive messages from family and friends at no extra cost.

Founded in 1992, the network's primary role is to provide reliable and effective radio communication opportunities for remote area travellers, on the road, at sea, or in the air. Nineteen base stations strategically located around Australia run daily scheduled sessions for contact with subscribers. These 'skeds', and a comprehensive messaging system are provided by a team of volunteer staff members. A number of salaried staff and other volunteers carry out administrative duties at a Head Office, in South Australia.

HF-Tel Services provide their service using the VKS737 facilities. HF-Tel is a division of the Australian National 4WD Radio Network Inc. and provides low-cost direct-dial telephone calls Radio-Telephone services exclusively for VKS-737 subscribers with suitably equipped radios to any fixed or mobile number within Australia.

All network activity involving both bases and subscribers is subject to formal licensing by the Australian Communications and Media Authority (ACMA).

History
Beginnings:

The use of HF between outback travellers goes back many years, based on Royal Flying Doctor Service frequencies such as 5300, 5360 & 5410 kHz.

“Mobile Outpost” licences allow the use of RFDS frequencies outside of base hours; however increasing numbers of users concerned the RFDS who in 1992 requested the Department of Transport and Communication (now ACMA) to limit the general use of their frequencies.

Mid 1992: Dept. of Transport and Communications contacted the SA Toyota Landcruiser Club (TLCC) regarding creating a network to allow members to communicate with each other and bases.

Submissions were lodged by Colin Brown and Jeff Francis from TLCC and a submission and licence application were lodged by Steve Johnston on behalf of the SA Association of Four-Wheel Drive Clubs (SAAFWDC).

Colin Brown is still actively involved as a show volunteer.

November 1993: The first VKS-737 Radio Network licence was issued and a base station established at Hilton in South Australia.

The Network, managed by Steve Johnston the Radio Officer of the SAAFWDC, was only available for use by members of South Australian 4WD Clubs.

March 1994: The Network was placed under the control of Steve Johnston, the Radio Officer of the Australian National Four Wheel Drive Council (ANFWDC), for use by members of 4WD Clubs Australia wide affiliated with ANFWDC via the state 4WD associations.

July 1994: Woomera Base opened.

August 1995: Gosford Base opened.

October 1996: The Australian National 4WD Radio Network was incorporated and the VKS-737 licences were transferred to the new organisation.

December 1996: The Australian Taxation Office issued approval for the Network to become "a Public Benevolent Institution established for the relief of sickness, suffering, helplessness, destitution and misfortune to a disadvantaged section of the community, being all 'outback' travellers who are in distress by providing them with emergency assistance and support in co-operation with other organisations".

February 1997: The Network became a partner in Tread Lightly! Australia. Steve Johnston appointed to the Board of Directors of Tread Lightly! Australia.

February 1997: Perth Base opened.

April 1997: Alice Springs Base opened.

July 1997: Agreement signed with SA Police to provide a joint safety network for subscribers, SA Police patrol cars, and police stations fitted with VKS-737 frequencies. Similar arrangements are now in place with emergency services in several other states.

All bases are linked to emergency services giving subscribers direct Seawall access.

Agreement signed with the Australian Customs Service (now Australian Border Force) for subscribers to be involved with the Customs Hotline (now Australian Border Watch Hotline).

December 1997: Woomera Base closed. St Marys Base opened.

June 1998: Sandstone Base opened.

January 1999: Darwin Base opened.

May 1999: Adelaide Base was relocated to the Head Office at Elizabeth. Cairns Base opened.

August 1999: Derby Base opened.

November 1999: Gosford Base closed. Newcastle Base opened.

September 2001: Charters Towers Base opened.

April 2004: Sandstone Base closed. Swan Hill Base opened.

2008: All bases upgraded with the latest generation Barrett 2060 radio-telephone interconnects.

August 2008: HF-Tel (a division of the Australian National 4WD Radio Network Inc.) was formed to provide direct-dial radio-telephone facilities for subscribers via the new Barrett 2060 radio-telephone interconnects.

November 2008: Two additional frequencies approved by ACMA for use by VKS-737 subscribers.

November 2009: Duplicated Base Stations installed at Alice Springs and Charters Towers.

January 2010: New digital PABX installed to allow improved communications between the Network and other Emergency Service Organisations.

May 2010: Duplicated Base Station installed at Adelaide

October 2010: The VKS-737 Radio Network formed a partnership with the Royal Flying Doctor Service of Australia   (Queensland Section and Western Operations) to provide Emergency HF radio communications services for the RFDS. As part of the agreement the VKS-737 Radio Network installed new base stations at the RFDS bases in Queensland and Western Australia, these bases operate on all VKS-737 frequencies as well as the existing frequencies licensed to the RFDS at the relevant base.

October 2010: VKS-737 Derby Base relocated to the RFDS Base.

October 2010: New VKS-737 Port Hedland Base commissioned at RFDS Base.

November 2010: New VKS-737 Carnarvon Base commissioned at Carnarvon RFDS Base.

November 2010: New VKS-737 Meekatharra Base commissioned at Meekatharra RFDS Base.

December 2010: New VKS-737 Cairns-1 Base commissioned at Cairns RFDS Base. The existing Cairns Base was renamed Cairns-2 Base.

January 2011: New VKS-737 Mount Isa Base commissioned at Mount Isa RFDS Base.

March 2011: New VKS-737 Charleville Base commissioned at Charleville RFDS Base.

June 2012: VKS-737 Cairns - 2 Base relocated from Innisfail to Malanda in the Atherton Tablelands.

August 2012: Head Office PABX extended with 100 dedicated VoIP lines enabling emergency services direct in-dialing to VKS-737 operators.

January 2013: VKS-737 services expanded to provide Emergency Service access to satellite telephone users who do not have HF radio facilities.

February 2013: Head Office PABX extended with a further 100 dedicated VoIP (total 200) lines to further enhance services in cases of emergency.

2017: All bases upgraded with the latest generation Codon 3033 / Envoy radio-telephone interconnects.

March 2019: Port Hedland Base closed due to termination of RFDS TX site lease at Port Hedland International Airport.

August 2019: Derby Base closed due to relocation of RFDS from Derby to Broome.

January 2020: Swan Hill Base closed and relocated to Stawell.

January 2020: Stawell Base commissioned.

Administration
The Australian National 4WD Radio Network Inc. is managed by a Committee of seven people who are elected for two-year terms by Network subscribers.

With the rapid increase in the size of the Network, it became apparent to the Committee that volunteers could not handle the workload necessary to continue the high quality of service that subscribers expected. It was decided in 2001 that the Network had to follow the example of many major charity organisations and employ paid staff at Head Office.

Head Office is located in Elizabeth in South Australia and employs four staff members.

The office is serviced by a PABX with two hundred VoIP telephone lines and one hundred and twenty remote VoIP extensions allowing multiple phone calls and internet access with minimum restrictions, this is very important when handling emergencies. Volunteer Operators and Committee Members are connected to Head Office (and each other) using dedicated VoIP telephones and VoIP equipped Smartphones.

The heart of the Network is the computer system comprising six networked computers. Data is mirrored to a secondary backup server unit as well as being regularly backed up off-site for security. Another computer is located at a remote office site dedicated to financial matters such as banking, payment of accounts, payroll, BAS statements, etc.

As part of the VKS-737 Risk Management strategy planning and implementation the office is protected against power failures by a dual battery bank and a 6.5 kW electric start generator.

Administration Manager
The Administration Manager, under general guidance from the committee, and in conjunction with the Finance Manager, is responsible for the day-to-day administration of the VKS-737 Network.

The duties performed include:

 Initiating public awareness of the VKS-737 Network.
 Liaison with the Australian Communications and Media Authority in matters relating to the use of VKS-737 frequencies, new frequencies, illegal or inappropriate use of frequencies etc.
 Liaise with government departments and other statutory bodies on matters relating to joint communication services and access to resources.
 Liaise with Emergency Service organisations regarding efficient and appropriate operating procedures.
 Liaise with the Australian Border Force to ensure that VKS-737 involvement with the Border Watch Hotline program is maintained and upgraded as necessary.

The position of Administration Manager is occupied on a part-time basis by Steve Johnston OAM; however, he puts in many hours per week of volunteer work for the Network

Steve spent 28 years with the Department of Civil Aviation / Civil Aviation Authority in the field of communications, he was involved in the design, installation, servicing and inspection of a wide range of equipment including HF systems.

In 1992 Steve left CAA to run his own business specialising in Outback HF communications systems. In 2001 he accepted the full-time role of Administration Manager of the VKS-737 Network.

On Australia Day, 26 January 2004, Steve was awarded the Medal of the Order of Australia for service to the community, particularly residents and travellers in remote locations, through the Australian National Four Wheel Drive Radio Network Inc.

Finance Manager
The Finance Manager, under general guidance from the elected Committee, and in conjunction with the Administration Manager, is responsible for the financial management of the Network. The duties performed include:

 Prepare annual operating budgets for endorsement by the committee.
 Liaise with Administration Manager to ensure Network expenditure is maintained within budget estimates.
 Ensure WorkCover arrangements and payments are up to date.
 Prepare quarterly BAS statements for the Australian Taxation Office.
 Prepare Annual financial statements for the Office of Consumer and Business Affairs.
 Arrange all Network insurance cover i.e. Property, Public Liability, Volunteer Cover, Professional Indemnity etc.
 Arrange for auditing of Network accounts.

The position of Finance Manager is occupied by Dave Lomman JP who is employed part-time by the Network; however, he (in conjunction with his wife Ros) puts in many hours per week of volunteer work for the Network.

Dave, who holds a Degree of Banking and Finance, has spent over 45 years in the finance industry including 32 years working for the Bank of South Australia (BankSA), of which 5 years were spent as a Branch Manager followed by 12 years as a Rural / Commercial Manager handling millions of dollars worth of customer's accounts.

After leaving BankSA Dave set up his own business providing consulting and bookkeeping services for businesses in the Barossa Valley.

Dave, a Justice of the Peace, is and/or has been involved in the running of many community organisations including:

 Chairman of Wheatfield's Residential Care Service.
 Chairman Wheatfield's Finance Committee currently working on a $2m redevelopment project.
 Vice Chairman Eudunda / Kapunda Health Service.
 Chairman of Eudunda / Kapunda Health Service Redevelopment Committee. ($2.4m project)
 Ex President of Kapunda Lions Club
 Councillor, Eudunda Area School Council (Curriculum and Finance Portfolio)
 President of Barossa 4WD Club Inc.
 Treasurer of Watch SA (Kapunda Branch).

Administration Assistant
The Administration Assistant reports directly to the Administration Manager and the Finance Manager and is responsible for the day-to-day running of the Head Office.

The Administration Assistant position is occupied by Mary Charles who has had over 30 years working in computer IT management both in the private and government sectors of New South Wales, South Australia, and overseas.

Finance Assistant
The Finance Assistant reports directly to the Administration Manager and the Finance Manager. The Finance Assistant position is occupied by Ros Lomman who has had over 35 years working for the Bank of South Australia (BankSA), many of these years as a Branch Manager.

Financial Overview
The majority of the financial income of the Network comes from subscription fees which are then placed back into the running of the organisation.

Excess funds are held in reserve for upgrading of equipment in the future and maintenance of existing equipment.

There are many costs involved including salaries and office accommodation, but without the staff and volunteers, an organisation the size of VKS-737 would be unable to operate with the efficiency that all subscribers have come to expect over the past 27 years.

References

External links
 http://www.vks737.radio
 

Emergency services in Australia